Armas Amukwiyu (born 22 April 1976) is a Namibian businessman and politician. He is a member of the ruling SWAPO party, and is the SWAPO Party Regional Coordinator for the Oshikoto Region and the chairperson of the SWAPO party's regional coordinators forum. He run but lost as a candidate for Secretary-General of SWAPO.

References

Living people
People from Oshikoto Region
SWAPO politicians
Namibian businesspeople
1976 births